Hysen Hostopalli was an Albanian politician and mayor of Elbasan from 1915 through 1916.

References

Year of birth missing
Year of death missing
Mayors of Elbasan